Flea Man is an American reality television series that premiered on National Geographic Channel on June 17, 2011. The show follows, flea market veteran, Jimmy Kaplow as he exercises his shrewd eye and haggling abilities to make a profit at flea markets, yard sales, and antiques fairs.

Jimmy Kaplow appeared on Good Day New York July 22, 2011, to give flea market tips and promote Flea Man.

Episodes

Series overview

Season 1 (2011)

References

External links 
 
 
 Flea Man on Facebook

2011 American television series debuts
2010s American reality television series
National Geographic (American TV channel)
2011 American television series endings